The third season of My Name Is Earl originally aired from September 27, 2007 to May 15, 2008 on NBC. Originally, 25 episodes were planned for the season, but due to the 2007-2008 writers' strike there were only 22 episodes.

Characters
 Jason Lee as Earl Hickey
 Jamie Pressly as Joy Turner
 Ethan Suplee as Randy Hickey
 Nadine Velazquez as Catalina
 Eddie Steeples as Darnell Turner

List of episodes

References

My Name Is Earl
2007 American television seasons
2008 American television seasons